Vita is an Italian electoral list running in the 2022 general election. It is led by Sara Cunial, a member of the Chamber of Deputies and former member of the Five Star Movement (M5S). The list includes anti-vaccine, anti-5G, anti-immigration and anti-gender movements, such as R2020, 3V Movement, No Fear Day, Sentinels of the Constitution - I'm with the Lawyer Polacco, The Italian People, People of Mothers, Italian Alliance Stop 5G, Popular Union for Free Italy and ENZIAN-Südtirol.

The founders describe the list as "a new open and inclusive political and social community", and "a list of those who, in these two years, have stood firm, loyal and courageous against the techno-sanitary dictatorship and the restriction of our natural and constitutional rights."

History 
At the end of July, the program of the list was published, among the points of which are: rejection of the green pass, freedom of information, alternative forms of education, constitutional freedoms, restoration of national sovereignty and freedom of business.

On 1 August, a press conference was held on the submission of a unitary list. After reaching the 36,000 signatures required for running, the list participated in the 2022 general election, obtaining about 0.7% of the votes.

Many members, dissatisfied with the results, left the list.

Composition

a Left following the results of the 2022 general elction.

Electoral results

References 

2022 establishments in Italy
Anti-vaccination organizations
Political parties established in 2022
Political party alliances in Italy